Aerosmith World Tour 2007 (or The Tour Heard 'Round the World) was a concert tour by American hard rock band Aerosmith that saw the band performing outside North America or Japan for the first time in about eight years (since the Nine Lives Tour), and in some countries, the first time in 14 years (since the Get a Grip Tour).  As part of the tour, the band also visited some countries for the first time ever, including India, the United Arab Emirates, Latvia, and Estonia.

The concert tour began in the spring of 2007 in South America, where the band performed to sold-out stadium crowds.  In the Summer of 2007, the band performed throughout Eurasia, including performances at several major rock festivals.  The band also played a select few concerts in Canada and California at the end of July.  In September 2007, the band performed eight dates in Northeastern North America, and concluded the tour with a private show in Hawaii.

Even though the tour was a brief 36 performances, the band performed in a total of 19 countries.  The tour was a large success, as Aerosmith was ranked #14 for the highest-grossing touring acts of 2007.

Set list 
 "Love in an Elevator"
 "Same Old Song and Dance"
 "Cryin'"
 "Eat the Rich"
 "Jaded"
 "I Don't Want to Miss a Thing"
 "What It Takes"
 "Baby, Please Don't Go"
 "Hangman Jury"
 "Seasons of Wither"
 "S.O.S. (Too Bad)"
 "Dream On"
 "Livin' on the Edge"
 "Stop Messin' Around"
 "Sweet Emotion"
 "Draw the Line"
 "Walk This Way"

Tour dates

References

Aerosmith concert tours
2007 concert tours